The Alliance for the Re-liberation of Somalia (ARS) was a Somali political party. A successor to the Islamic Courts Union, it was launched in September 2007.

History of the ARS

Members of the Islamic Courts Union and Somali opposition leaders united to form a political party. Roughly 400 delegates, including former Islamic Courts Union, ICU Executive chairman Sharif Sheikh Ahmed, former TFG Speaker of Parliament Sharif Hassan Sheikh Aden, and the former TFG Deputy Prime Minister Hussein Mohamed Farrah, approved a constitution and committee. A 191-member Central Committee was chaired by Sharif Hassan Sheikh Aden. Hassan Dahir Aweys explicitly stated he did not hold any formal position in the Alliance. Reporters at the Somali Congress for Liberation and Reconstitution in Asmara, the capital of Eritrea said the alliance would be unlikely to be Islamist-led as the opposition would be hoping to draw on the broad political support and fundraising opportunities of the Somali diaspora.

The Djibouti Agreement

 

The Djibouti Agreement was a peace agreement signed by the ARS and the Transitional Federal Government in 2008.

References

Organizations established in 2007
2007 establishments in Somalia
Defunct political parties in Somalia
Djibouti–Somalia relations
Organizations disestablished in 2009
Islamic political parties in Somalia